A  statue of Tomochichi was temporarily installed outside the Millennium Gate Museum in Atlanta, Georgia, in 2021. There are plans to relocated the artwork to Rodney Cook Sr. Park in Vine City.

References

2021 establishments in Georgia (U.S. state)
2021 sculptures
Buildings and structures in Atlanta
Monuments and memorials in Georgia (U.S. state)
Outdoor sculptures in Georgia (U.S. state)
Sculptures of men in Georgia
Sculptures of Native Americans
Statues in Georgia (U.S. state)